= International Association of Ear Piercing Market Specialists =

International Association of Ear Piercing Market Specialists (EPM)
- Internationaler Verband der Ohrlochstech-Spezialisten
- Abbreviation: EPM e.V.
- Predecessor: EPM, founded in Stamford, United Kingdom, in 1999
- Formation: March 19, 2015; 10 years ago
- Type: industry association
- Headquarters: Lindau, Germany
- 1st Chairperson: Éva Nagy
- 2nd Chairperson: Francesco Trevisan
- Treasurer: Ron Maguire
- Secretary: Esther Lenssen
- Website: https://epmeurope.org

The International Association of Ear Piercing Market Specialists (EPM) – German: Internationaler Verband der Ohrlochstech-Spezialisten e.V. – is a European industry association representing manufacturers and distributors of ear piercing systems. Headquartered in Lindau, Germany, EPM promotes hygienic standards, professional training, and consumer safety in the ear piercing industry.

== History ==
The association was formally established in 2015, evolving from a predecessor founded in Stamford, United Kingdom, in 1999. Its creation responded to the growing popularity of ear piercing and the need for unified hygiene and safety standards across Europe.

== Background ==
Ear piercing has been practiced for thousands of years, with archaeological evidence dating back to 8,200–7,500 BCE. In ancient civilizations such as Egypt, Greece, Rome, and China, earrings often signified social status or religious affiliation. Historically, piercing techniques lacked modern hygiene standards, frequently resulting in infections due to non-sterile tools and ineffective disinfectants.

Technical evolution: Mid‑20th‑century devices were typically simple, gun‑like tools where hygiene and user safety received limited emphasis. By the turn of the millennium, modern single‑use, cartridge‑based sterile systems became common, designed to minimize infection risk, support better healing, and making ear piercing more comfortable.

== Objectives ==
EPM aims to establish a Europe-wide professional standard for hygienic ear piercing. Its guidelines emphasize:

- Consumer protection
- Safe procedures
- Transparent processes
- Risk minimization
- Proper aftercare
- Professional accountability

== Activities ==
EPM engages in various initiatives, including:

- Representing member companies in policy and industry forums
- Developing and publishing hygiene guidelines
- Collaborating with health authorities on EU and national regulations
- Offering professional training and certification (EPM certified)
- Participating in trade fairs and conferences
- Educating consumers and practitioners on hygiene, safety and technology

== Certification ==
The EPM certified program confirms that practitioners or companies adhere to EPM’s hygiene and safety standards. Certification includes training, compliance monitoring, and ongoing education.

== Partnerships ==
EPM collaborates with industry bodies such as the Bundesverband der Juweliere, Schmuck- und Uhrenfachgeschäfte e.V. (BVJ), the German association of jewelers and watch retailers.

== Members ==
EPM includes member companies from across Europe, such as:

- 🇬🇧 CAFLON Ltd. (United Kingdom)
- 🇦🇹 Fritz Schneider GmbH (Austria, STUDEX distributor)
- 🇮🇹 SANICO S.R.L. (Italy, Inverness distributor)
- 🇩🇪 STUDEX Deutschland GmbH (Germany)
- 🇪🇸 STUDEX Ibérica SL (Spain)
- 🇮🇹 STUDEX Italia Srl (Italy)
- 🇦🇹 STUDEX of Europe GmbH (Austria)
- 🇵🇱 STUDEX Poland Ltd. (Poland)
- 🇹🇷 STUDEX Turkey – İthalat İhracat Ticaret Ltd. (Türkiye)
- 🇨🇭 Zanella Fashion + Design GmbH (Switzerland, STUDEX distributor)

== Related Links ==
- Official EPM website, International Association of Ear Piercing Market Specialists
